The 1940 City of Chester by-election was a byelection to the United Kingdom House of Commons for the constituency of City of Chester which occurred following the death of Sir Charles Cayzer.  The election was unopposed.

The result of the by-election was as follows:

1940 elections in the United Kingdom
1940 in England
20th century in Cheshire
History of Chester
Politics of Chester
By-elections to the Parliament of the United Kingdom in Cheshire constituencies
Unopposed by-elections to the Parliament of the United Kingdom (need citation)